Mere Haule Dost is an 2013 
Hindi film directed by Nitin Raghunath and produced by Pramida Posanipalli, Rajiv Thakur and Nitin Raghunath. The film was released on 7 June 2013.
The film features Anirudh Loka, Raghuvardhan Garlapati, Aadil Abedi, Rishit Samala and Kiran Gadalay as main characters.

Cast
Anirudh Loka
Raghuvardhan Garlapati
Aadil Abedi
Rishit Samala
Kiran Gadalay
Preeti Gupta
Catherine Fallows
Zainab Lax
Yantisha Singh
Harika Vedula
Babita Punetha
Natasha Pamnani
Anand Natesh

References

External links
Official Website.

2010s Hindi-language films
Indian romantic comedy films
2013 films
2013 romantic comedy films